Charlie Hedley (1881–1942) was a pioneer Australian rugby league footballer. He was one of his country's first national representative players appearing in the inaugural professional series against New Zealand in 1907 and making the 1908–09 Kangaroo tour of Great Britain.

Playing career
Hedley had been a Glebe rugby union player before he joined the Glebe rugby league club in its inaugural 1908 season. He had been one of the pioneers who was barred from the amateur code when selected in the inaugural New South Wales professional rugby side who met Albert Baskiville's rebel All Golds when the arrived in Sydney in 1907 for a series played in rugby union rules.

Following his first season with Glebe in 1908 – the inaugural season for rugby league in Australia, he was selected as part of the Australia national rugby league team to go on the 1908–09 Kangaroo tour of Great Britain. He played in seventeen matches of the tour including the third Test against England.

Upon his return he played two season with the Annandale club in Sydney.

He was awarded Life Membership of the New South Wales Rugby League in 1914.

Death
Hedley died suddenly at his Leichhardt home on 13 August 1942 with his wife and two children at his side. He was buried at Rookwood Cemetery on Saturday 15 August 1942.

References

Bibliography
 Whiticker, Alan & Hudson, Glen (2006) The Encyclopedia of Rugby League Players, Gavin Allen Publishing, Sydney

1881 births
1942 deaths
Annandale rugby league players
Australian rugby league players
Australia national rugby league team players
Glebe rugby league players
New South Wales rugby league team players
Rugby league fullbacks
Rugby league players from Newcastle, New South Wales
Date of birth missing